"For The Gambia Our Homeland" is the national anthem of the Gambia. It is based on the music of a traditional Mandinka song, to which original Mandinka lyrics were written by Jali Nyama Suso. An English arrangement and translation were made by husband and wife Jeremy and Virginia Howe and adopted as the national anthem in 1965.

History 
In the lead-up to the Gambia's independence from the United Kingdom on 18 February 1965, a National Anthem Selection Committee was set up to accept submissions for a national anthem for the country. The Committee would ultimately receive three submissions. One submission, by Reverend John Colley Faye, although acknowledged as "superb" in content, was rejected for being too long, with the Committee preferring something more to the point and easy to memorise.

Mandinka musician Jali Nyama Suso was approached by the government to compose an entry. He responded that he would base his proposal on a traditional Mandinka tune dedicated Foday Kabba Dumbuya (or Fodee Kaba Dumbuya), a Muslim reformer and warrior remembered for his conquests for Islam, and a patron of Jali Nyama's grandfather. Jali Nyama stated that basing national anthems on odes to local historical figures had been done in nearby Guinea and Mali. Jali Nyama wrote his own Mandinka lyrics to the tune.

Jali Nyama's proposal was recorded and sent to be heard in the Prime Minister's office in the Cabinet, where it was liked by Prime Minister Dawda Jawara. After it was also well received by Governor-General John Paul, it was sent to be translated into English by Jeremy Frederick Howe, Chairman of the Selection Committee. Howe was a member of the Gambia Colonial Service from 1954 to 1965, an Administrative Officer in the Ministry of Local Government. Howe would ultimately be credited for the composition of the anthem, while his wife, Virginia Julia Howe, a university-trained composer, would be credited for the English translation.

Lyrics 
The original lyrics are in English, but have been translated into local languages such as Mandinka and Wolof.

Notes

References

External links

Gambian music
National symbols of the Gambia
African anthems
Year of song missing
National anthem compositions in C major